Calorezia is a small genus of flowering plants in the family Asteraceae. It is made up of two species that were separated from genus Perezia in 2007. They are perennial herbs with pink-purple flowers.

 Species
 Calorezia nutans (Less.) Panero - Chile, Argentina
 Calorezia prenanthoides (Less.) Panero - Chile, Argentina

References 

Asteraceae genera
Mutisieae
Flora of South America